Trifonov is a Bulgarian and Russian masculine surname, its feminine counterpart is Trifonova. It may refer to:
Aleksandr Trifonov (biathlete) (born 1986), Kazakh biathlete
Aleksandr Trifonov (canoeist), Russian sprint canoeist 
Andrey Trifonov (born 1965), Russian politician
Daniil Trifonov (born 1991), Russian concert pianist and composer
Edward Trifonov (born 1937), Russian-born Israeli molecular biophysicist 
Filip Trifonov (1947–2021), Bulgarian actor
Iliyan Trifonov (born 1984), Bulgarian football player
Ivan Trifonov (born 1948), Russian cyclist
Kamen Trifonov (born 1990), Bulgarian football player
Krasen Trifonov (born 1983), Bulgarian football midfielder 
Oleg Trifonov (born 1981), Russian football player 
Petar Trifonov (born 1984), Bulgarian football player
Rumen Trifonov (born 1985), Bulgarian football player
Slavi Trifonov (born 1966), Bulgarian actor, singer and politician
Tihomir Trifonov (born 1986), Bulgarian football player 
Valentin Trifonov (1888–1938), Russian revolutionary 
Yury Trifonov (1925–1981), Russian author

Bulgarian-language surnames
Russian-language surnames

Patronymic surnames